White Tie and Tails is a 1946 American black-and-white comedy drama film directed by Charles Barton and starring Dan Duryea, Ella Raines, William Bendix, and Frank Jenks. The film tagline is "Clothes Don't Make the Man ... a Gentleman!" The film is based on Rufus King's serial novel Double Murder published in Red Book Magazine and on Charles Beakon's play Dangerously Yours.

Plot
In New York City, a head butler (Dan Duryea) of a wealthy house of the Latimers stays to look after the mansion while the owners' family leaves for a vacation in Florida. However, he is going to have his own vacation there in the mansion, playing a rich man. He meets a beautiful woman (Ella Raines) and promises her to bail out her sister's large gambling debts owed to a ruthless gangster (William Bendix). However, the butler soon finds himself in trouble as the gangster later reveals that the debts may be up to $100,000 and that he needs a pair of valuable paintings from the Latimers' house as a collateral for the butler's check.

Cast
Dan Duryea as Charles Dumont
Ella Raines as Louise Bradford
William Bendix as Larry Lundie
Frank Jenks as George
Richard Gaines as Archer
Donald Curtis as Nate Romero
Clarence Kolb as Mr. Arkwright
Barbara Brown as Mrs. Latimer
John Miljan as Mr. Latimer
Samuel S. Hinds as Mr. Bradford
Nita Hunter as Betty Latimer
Scotty Beckett as Bill Latimer
William Trenk as Emil
Patricia Alphin as Cynthia Bradford
Joan Shawlee as Virgie (as Joan Fulton)

Production
The film was produced by Howard Benedict for Universal Pictures and filmed at Universal Studios in Universal City, California. The film was originally intended to be directed by William Seitner. The story was written by  Charles Beakon (author of the play) and Rufus King (author of the novel).

Distribution
The film was released by Universal Pictures under the title White Tie and Tails in the United States on August 30, 1946. The film was also re-released under the title The Swindlers.

Other distributions
Sweden on January 27, 1947 (En skojare i frack)
Finland on February 13, 1948 (Hovimestari järjestää kaiken)
Portugal on May 27, 1949 (Cavalheiro Por Uma Noite)
Brazil (Cavalheiro por uma Noite)
Italy (Frac e cravatta bianca)

References

External links

1946 films
1946 comedy-drama films
1940s English-language films
American comedy-drama films
Universal Pictures films
Films directed by Charles Barton
1940s American films